Callie Reitz (20 February 1927 – 26 August 2016) was a South African wrestler. He competed at the 1948 Summer Olympics and the 1952 Summer Olympics.

References

External links
 

1927 births
2016 deaths
South African male sport wrestlers
Olympic wrestlers of South Africa
Wrestlers at the 1948 Summer Olympics
Wrestlers at the 1952 Summer Olympics
Sportspeople from Pretoria
Commonwealth Games medallists in wrestling
Commonwealth Games bronze medallists for South Africa
Wrestlers at the 1950 British Empire Games
Medallists at the 1950 British Empire Games